Christian Gow (born March 28, 1993) is a Canadian biathlete.

Gow is the younger brother of Canadian biathlete Scott Gow, competing alongside each other representing Canada at World Championships and both the 2018 and 2022 Winter Olympics.

Career
In January 2018, Gow was named to Canada's 2018 Olympic team.

In January 2022, Gow was named to Canada's 2022 Olympic team. At the games, Gow was part of the relay team that finished in 6th, Canada's highest ever placement in the event.

Biathlon results
All results are sourced from the International Biathlon Union.

Olympic Games
0 medals

World Championships
1 medal (1 bronze)

*During Olympic seasons competitions are only held for those events not included in the Olympic program.

References

External links
Christian Gow at the Canadian Olympic Committee

1993 births
Living people
Biathlon World Championships medalists
Canadian male biathletes
Place of birth missing (living people)
Biathletes at the 2018 Winter Olympics
Biathletes at the 2022 Winter Olympics
Olympic biathletes of Canada
Sportspeople from Calgary